Fistball was introduced as a World Games sport for men at the 1985 World Games in London. Women's fistball competition has not yet been introduced.

Medalists

World Games - Men

External links
 50 years brochure by IFA

 
Sports at the World Games
Fistball